The Never Turn Back is a grade II listed public house in Caister-on-Sea, Norfolk, England. It was designed by A. W. Ecclestone  in the Art Deco and Streamline Moderne styles and built in 1956 (opening the following year) as a memorial to the nine lifeboatmen who died in the Caister lifeboat disaster of 1901.

Arthur William "Billy" Ecclestone was chief surveyor of Norfolk brewers Lacons.

References

External links

Buildings and structures completed in 1957
Grade II listed pubs in Norfolk
Streamline Moderne architecture in the United Kingdom
Caister-on-Sea
Pubs in Norfolk